Aaron Hape is a Fellow of the Royal Society of Arts and in 2017 became the first person of Māori descent to be invested as an Associate Fellow of the Royal Commonwealth Society.

Background and education 
Hape was raised in Dannevirke and undertook his early education at Southwell School and Palmerston North Boys' High School. He gained a Bachelor of Arts from Victoria University of Wellington and is an alumnus of the United States Department of State's International Visitor Leadership Program.

Hape's great-grandfather is New Zealand rugby league footballer Frank Barclay and his grand-uncle is New Zealand Māori Rugby Team captain and military officer Wattie Barclay.

He is a supporter of constitutional monarchy in New Zealand and is an ambassador for the New Zealand Women's Refuge. Hape is affiliated with the iwi Ngāti Kahungunu ki Wairarapa Tāmaki nui-a-Rua.

International work

The Commonwealth 
Hape is the founder of Commonwealth Youth New Zealand. From 2014 to 2017 he served as the organisation's inaugural executive director. During his tenure, Hape was appointed as a Member of the Advisory Panel for the Queen's Young Leader Award. Sponsored by British charities Comic Relief and the Queen Elizabeth Diamond Jubilee Trust, the programme recognised leadership skills by young persons aged between 19 and 29 years old who were citizens of member states of the Commonwealth of Nations.

Hape was appointed by the then-Commonwealth Secretary-General, Kamalesh Sharma, to serve as a Member of the Commonwealth Observer Group for the 2015 Trinidad and Tobago general election. The group, led by the former Speaker of the National Parliament of the Solomon Islands, Sir Paul Tovua, found that the election met the Commonwealth's standards for democratic elections and stated that it was conducted in a "credible and transparent manner".

Subsequently, Hape stated that the Commonwealth was "in urgent need of a renewed purpose". In the lead-up to the 2015 Commonwealth Heads of Government Meeting he publicly called on delegates to consider selecting a Secretary-General who could bring a broader range of experience than he claimed that previous office holders held and maintained that the new leader would have to "unify the leadership and aspirations of Commonwealth societies and groups behind the work of the Secretariat".

In 2016, Hape raised concerns about the rule of law in the Republic of Maldives after the Commonwealth Ministerial Action Group noted that the country had been failing to uphold human rights and that democratic standards were deteriorating. In response to the arrest of the then-opposition leader Sheikh Imran Abdulla, he argued that the government of the Maldives "reacted with a show of force rather than take steps to rectify these very serious issues with the rule of law and transparency". The country withdrew its membership of the Commonwealth in October 2016 and rejoined in February 2020.

Non-state diplomacy 
In August 2016, Hape was selected to join the inaugural Timor Leste-New Zealand Dialogue - known as the "Timor Talks". The dialogue aimed to build cultural and diplomatic ties between the two countries and built on the Asia New Zealand Foundation's existing Track II diplomacy programme. In 2019, he went on to found the World Economic Forum's Global Shapers Community group in Wellington, New Zealand, which implements social justice projects that advance the mission of World Economic Forum.

Recognition and awards 
Hape was awarded the Sir Apirana Ngata Memorial Scholarship in 2010. In 2014, he was named as one of the inaugural recipients of the Minister for Youth Affairs Leadership Award.

In recognition of his work in the Commonwealth he was awarded a New Zealander of the Year Local Hero Medal and was named as a finalist for the Young Wellingtonian of the Year Award in 2015. In addition was he elected as a Fellow of the Royal Society of Arts and as an Associate Fellow of the Royal Commonwealth Society in 2017.

Bibliography 

 Bureau of Educational and Cultural Affairs. (2019). Advancing an Open, Reliable and Secure Digital Economy - A Multi-Regional Project. United States Department of State.
 Baker, Juno (ed.) (2017). A Year of Leading Change. University of Cambridge Institute of Continuing Education.
 Commonwealth Governance and Peace Directorate (2015). Report of the Commonwealth Observer Group for the 2015 Trinidad and Tobago Parliamentary Elections. Commonwealth Secretariat.
 The Queen's Young Leaders Award. (2015). A Report on Progress 2012 - 2014. The Queen Elizabeth Diamond Jubilee Trust.
 Browne, Richard. (ed.). (2010). The Palmerstonian (Vol. 104). Palmerston North Boys’ High School.
 Browne, Richard. (ed.). (2009). The Palmerstonian (Vol. 23). Palmerston North Boys’ High School.

References

External links 

 Profile on the World Economic Forum website
 Profile on Women's Refuge website
 Profile on the New Zealand Caribbean Council website
 Profile on the University of Cambridge Institute of Continuing Education website
 Profile on the Advertising Standards Authority website

Living people
New Zealand Māori people
Ngāti Kahungunu people
Victoria University of Wellington alumni
People educated at Palmerston North Boys' High School
People from Dannevirke
New Zealand monarchists
1991 births
